Matthew James Salmon (born January 21, 1958) is an American politician who served as a U.S. representative from Arizona from 1995 to 2001 and again from 2013 until 2017. A member of the Republican Party, he retired from office after representing . The district is based in Mesa and includes most of the East Valley; he previously represented Arizona's 1st congressional district. In 2002, he lost by less than 1% to Janet Napolitano in a highly competitive gubernatorial race. He regained a congressional seat in the 2012 election.

On February 25, 2016, Salmon announced his retirement from politics. In June 2016, Arizona State University announced that Salmon would join his undergraduate alma mater as vice president for Government Affairs in the Office of Government & Community Engagement. In this position, Salmon oversees the university's local, state and federal relations teams. He also holds a faculty appointment as a professor of Practice in Public Affairs in the ASU College of Public Service & Community Solutions. In April 2020, Salmon was named Chairman of the American Kratom Association. The nonprofit organization "advocates to protect the freedom of consumers to safely consume natural kratom as a part of their personal health and well-being regimen." He was a candidate in the 2022 Arizona gubernatorial election.

Early life and education 
Salmon was born in Salt Lake City, Utah to Robert James Salmon and Gloria Aagard Salmon. Salmon's maternal great-grandfather was born in Denmark. Salmon moved to Tempe at age 12 and graduated from Mesa High School in 1976. Salmon is a member of the Church of Jesus Christ of Latter-day Saints. He lived in Taiwan from 1977 to 1979 as a missionary and speaks fluent Mandarin Chinese. Salmon was also a Sunday School teacher, cubmaster and gospel doctrine teacher with his church. After graduating from college, Salmon worked as a telecommunications executive at Mountain Bell in 1981, eventually becoming community relations manager with Mountain Bell's successor, US West. Salmon was offered the position of director of public relations with US West in 1990, but declined the position, after deciding to run for State Senate.

Arizona Senate (1991–1995)

Elections 
In 1990, he ran for the Arizona Senate in the 21st Senate District based in Mesa, Arizona. In the Republican primary, he defeated incumbent State Senator Jerry Gillespie, who was controversial due to his support of impeached Governor Evan Mecham and his vote against the Martin Luther King holiday. In the general election, he defeated Democrat Bill Hegarty 60–40%. In 1992, he won re-election to a second term unopposed.

Tenure 
In 1992, he was elected to a new leadership position called assistant majority leader. He served that position until 1995.

In 1993, he sponsored legislation that created new drug test programs for employers. That year, he also called for an independent study of the Department of Economic Services' child welfare agency.

Committee assignments 
 Senate Appropriations Committee
 Senate Indian Gambling Committee (Co-chairman)
 Senate Rules Committee (Chairman)

U.S. House of Representatives (1995–2001)

Elections 

1994
Incumbent U.S. Representative Sam Coppersmith, a Democrat, decided to retire after one term in what was then the 1st district in order to run for the U.S. Senate. Salmon won the Republican primary with a plurality of 39% in a five-candidate field. During his first congressional campaign, term limits were a high-profile issue. Salmon was one of many candidates nationwide who pledged to serve only three terms in Congress. In the general election, he defeated Democratic State Senator Chuck Blanchard, 56%–39%.

1996
He won re-election to a second term with 60% of the vote.

1998
He won re-election to a third term with 65% of the vote.

2000

He honored his campaign pledge (one of many who pledged to do so in the class of `94) and did not seek re-election to a fourth term in 2000. He was then succeeded by Jeff Flake.

Tenure 
During the 1994 congressional election, Salmon signed the Contract with America.

In 1999, he unsuccessfully advocated carving Ronald Reagan's face into Mount Rushmore, stating "He's the president that ended the Cold War. You think about 40 years of a major threat, not only to our country but to the world at large, being ended by one man - that's quite an achievement." Salmon's idea garnered support from Reps. Roscoe G. Bartlett (R-Md.) and John R. Kasich (R-Ohio).

Salmon was instrumental in obtaining the January 29, 2000 release of U.S.-based academic researcher Song Yongyi from detention in China on spying charges.

Accomplishments
 "Watchdog of the Treasury" award six years in a row
 "Taxpayer Hero" award from Citizens Against Government Waste
 "Friend of Small Business" award from the National Federation of Independent Business

Committee assignments 
 Committee on International Relations
 Committee on Science
 Committee on Small Business
 Committee on Education and the Workforce

Inter-congressional years (2001–2011)

2002 gubernatorial election 

Incumbent Republican Arizona Governor Jane Dee Hull was ineligible for re-election in 2002. In the Republican primary, Salmon defeated Arizona Secretary of State Betsy Bayless and Arizona Treasurer Carol Springer 56–30–14%. He won every county in the state. In the general election, he faced Democratic nominee and Arizona Attorney General Janet Napolitano, Libertarian nominee Barry Hess, and former Arizona Secretary of State Richard D. Mahoney (who ran as an independent, but was previously a Democrat). Napolitano defeated Salmon 46.2–45.2%, a difference of just 11,819 votes.

Political activism 

After that race, he served as a lobbyist and chairman of the Arizona Republican Party. In 2007, he served as campaign manager to businessman Scott Smith's successful campaign for Mayor of Mesa. In 2008, he became President of the Competitive Telecommunications Association, a Washington, D.C.-based trade association.

U.S. House of Representatives (2013–2017)

Elections

2012 

In April 2011, Salmon announced he would seek his old congressional seat, which was now numbered as the 5th District. His conception of term limits had evolved: in 2011 he stated that they were a flawed concept unless they were applied across the board. His successor in Congress, Jeff Flake, was giving up the seat to run for the United States Senate. He was endorsed by the Club for Growth, Governor Jan Brewer, Senator John Thune, Congressman David Schweikert, Congressman Trent Franks, and former Florida Governor Jeb Bush. In the August 28 Republican primary, he defeated former state house speaker Kirk Adams 52–48%. In the general election, Salmon defeated Democrat Spencer Morgan 65–35%.

2014 

Salmon was reelected almost as easily in 2014. However, he announced on February 25, 2016, that he is retiring for good.

Committee assignments 
 Committee on International Relations / Committee on Foreign Affairs
 Chair, Subcommittee on Western Hemisphere
 Chair, Subcommittee on Asia and the Pacific
 Committee on Education and the Workforce

Tenure 
In March 2013, he endorsed the idea of bringing back the Hastert Rule, which is that in order to bring a bill to the floor it must have a majority of the majority party's support. He also proposed an amendment to the United States Constitution limiting House members to three terms in office and Senators to two.

Abortion
Salmon is pro-life and has opposed federal funding of abortions as well as family-planning assistance that includes abortions.

Gay rights
Salmon voted to ban gay couples adopting children and opposes gay marriage.

In April 2013, Salmon announced that he would continue to oppose same-sex marriage even though his son is openly gay. Salmon's stances have been unmoved despite his acceptance of his son's homosexuality. Salmon's son led the Arizona Log Cabin Republicans; he left the group to focus on medical school.

Civil Rights

Salmon is strictly opposed to the surveillance of personal emails and phone calls currently allowed and has called for legislation to reduce it. He introduced a bill that would better protect privacy rights by limiting the ability of the government to perform
unwarranted searches.

Environment
Salmon has been a moderate supporter of environmental protection. He voted to enforce environmental standards on new pipelines, prohibit the EPA from being barred from investigations, reduce nuclear waste, and provide larger forest conservation.

Budget

Salmon is a fiscal conservative and has often caused rifts and defections in his own party to oppose increasing the deficit. He has strictly opposed raising the debt limit and any new spending without matching cuts. He believes government agencies and institutions should undergo reform, not expansion, to meet their needs.

Taxes
Matt Salmon signed the Taxpayer Protection Pledge, stating he would never vote for legislation to increase taxes on Americans. He opposes new government spending unless it has a plan to initiate some spending cut that will offset the loss. He has voted to cut various taxes, such as the estate and marriage taxes.

Following the recent IRS scandal and the wake of investigation, Salmon called upon Attorney General Eric Holder to hold independent investigation on the IRS for its alleged targeting of its political opponents due allow for an unbiased non-government council to look into the matter.

He is a cosponsor to a bill that would prevent political bias causing any discrimination in tax treatment.

In 2011 Salmon signed a pledge sponsored by Americans for Prosperity promising to vote against any climate change legislation that would raise taxes.

2022 Arizona gubernatorial campaign 

In June 2021, he declared his candidacy in the 2022 race for Arizona governor, to succeed term limited incumbent Republican Doug Ducey. He had been endorsed by Ted Cruz and the Club for Growth, among others. Salmon dropped out of the race on June 28, 2022.

Electoral history

References

Further reading 

 2002 Arizona Governor's Race USA Today November 11, 2002
 Salmon holds vision for Arizona's GOP "Ex-congressman eyes chairman seat" The Arizona Republic November 28, 2004

External links 

 
 
 
 

|-

|-

|-

|-

|-

1958 births
20th-century American politicians
21st-century American politicians
American Mormon missionaries in Taiwan
American people of Danish descent
Arizona Republican Party chairs
Republican Party Arizona state senators
Arizona State University alumni
Brigham Young University alumni
Latter Day Saints from Arizona
Latter Day Saints from Utah
Living people
Politicians from Mesa, Arizona
Politicians from Salt Lake City
Republican Party members of the United States House of Representatives from Arizona
Mesa High School alumni